Śāsana (śāsana;) is a Buddhist and Shaivite term for their philosophy and practice. It can be translated as teaching, practice, discipline, doctrine, and "the teaching of the Buddha". Since in Buddhism there is no divine being, Śāsana is considered a more accurate description than "religion" as it avoids the implication of a non-changing divine call from an all-knowing god. 

Śāsana is also used for the 5000-year Buddha's Dispensation; the current śāsana is that of Śakyamuni Buddha.

References

Buddhist philosophical concepts